Ñust'apata (Quechua ñust'a princess, pata elevated place; above, at the top; edge, bank, shore, step) "princess bank") is a mountain in the Cusco Region in Peru, about  high. It is situated in the Calca Province, on the border of the districts of Pisac and Taray. Ñust'apata lies on the left bank of the Willkanuta River, near the archaeological park of Pisac.

References 

Mountains of Peru
Mountains of Cusco Region